Marian Academy is a private Catholic pre-school, primary and secondary school, located in Georgetown, Guyana. It is situated on Carifesta Avenue in central Georgetown.

History
The school was opened on 14 September 1998, with 227 enrolled students. By 2001, the school had doubled in size, recording a figure of 453 students.

Since 2008, the school has run an annual "blood drive", in which students are encouraged to become blood donors.  The drive is organised in collaboration with Guyana Red Cross and the National Blood Transfusion Service (NBTS).

In 2015, the school signed a Memorandum of Understanding with Jinshan Middle School in Fuzhou, China making Marian Academy the first school in Guyana to have a sister school in China. In 2019, 20 students from Marian visited Jinshan.

Environs 
It is between a YMCA and the Guyana National Park.

See also

 Education in Guyana
 List of schools in Guyana
 Roman Catholicism in Guyana

References

External links
 

1998 establishments in Guyana

Christianity in Georgetown, Guyana
Educational institutions established in 1998
Catholic elementary and primary schools in Guyana
Catholic secondary schools in Guyana